Chaohu University (Chinese: 巢湖学院), in Chaohu, Anhui Province of China, is an institution of higher learning under jurisdiction of Anhui Province.

The university was founded in 1977 as Chaohu Specialized Normal School. Upon the approval of the Ministry of Education in April 2002, it was elevated and renamed Chaohu University, affiliated to the Education Bureau of Anhui Province.

Chaohu University has a land area of 650,000 sq meters, among which the constructed area covers 250,000 sq meters. The university publishes the Newspaper of Chaohu University.

The school is located in the scenic national tourist resort - hefei chaohu half soup hot spring health resort, one of the most famous towns of hot spring water in China. We have a very preferable environment of educating and studying with beautiful lake view and Tangshan Mountain back to the campus, which will provide you with the very pleasing scenery.

There are 13 secondary colleges with 53 undergraduate majors, belonging to the 9 disciplines of economics, law, teaching, liberal arts, history, science, engineering, management and art. There are 1 national-level characteristic specialty construction point, 8 provincial-level characteristic specialty construction point, 6 provincial-level comprehensive specialty reform pilot projects, 6 provincial-level demonstration experiment practice training centers, and 4 provincial-level outstanding talent education and training programs.

The total number of full-time students is 16,617.

Adhere to the open school, with anhui province application-oriented undergraduate universities "xingzhi alliance" as the support, constantly deepen inter-school cooperation, achieve credit mutual recognition and resource sharing. Actively promote international exchanges and cooperation, establish cooperative relations with 15 universities in South Korea, the United States, Ireland and other countries as well as Taiwan, carry out 2+2 cooperative project of visual communication design undergraduate education with hanseo university of South Korea, and 3+1 cooperative project of Hospitality Management undergraduate education with athlone institute of technology (AIT) of Ireland.

Based on the cultivation of application-oriented talents, we will continuously strengthen the education of industry-university-research cooperation, and actively expand the depth and breadth of cooperation between schools and enterprises in terms of personnel training, resource co-construction, technology research and development, teacher training, internship and employment. 
With Huawei, Iflytek, Whirlpool (China), Anhui fuhuang, Wanwei group, Anhui huaxing chemical, Chaohu People's Court and more than 100 enterprises and institutions to maintain a stable relationship of cooperation. At present, there are 1 national-level school-enterprise cooperative practical education base and 5 provincial-level bases.

Its current president is Jiagui Zhu.

External links

 https://www.chu.edu.cn/13/list.htm
 https://www.chu.edu.cn/

Universities and colleges in Anhui
Educational institutions established in 1977
1977 establishments in China